Pablo Kang (born 1973) is an Australian diplomat and public servant serving as the Australian ambassador to Cambodia since January 2020. He was Australian Ambassador to the United Arab Emirates from 2012 to 2016 and Australian High Commissioner to Vanuatu from 2009 to 2010.

Life and career
Born in 1973, Pablo Kang was named after the Spanish artist Pablo Picasso. His parents had emigrated to Australia from Korea in the 1960s.

Kang took up an appointment as Australian High Commissioner to Vanuatu in January 2009. He was responsible for overseeing the implementation of the Australian Government's new aid development arrangements and for arranging Vanuatu's participation in the Pacific Seasonal Worker Pilot Scheme. When he returned to Australia in 2010, Kang was appointed Assistant Secretary heading the International Organisations Branch.

In 2012 Kang was appointed Australia's Ambassador to the United Arab Emirates and to Qatar. He relocated to Abu Dhabi to take up the post. Kang helped to secure the release and return home of Marcus Lee in January 2014. Lee, an Australian businessman, had been detained in Dubai since 2009 on fraud charges related to a Dubai property deal involving Sunland Group. Also in 2014 Kang worked with the UAE Government to bring into force the Australia-UAE bilateral agreement on the peaceful uses of nuclear energy. Under the agreement, Australian uranium suppliers can export uranium to the UAE, which Kang said would represent a considerable diversification in the current terms of trade between the two countries. Kang's posting to Abu Dhabi ended on 5 January 2016 and he was subsequently posted to Cambodia as ambassador in December 2019. Kang was in the post during the COVID-19 pandemic in Cambodia, and announced that Australia would provide COVID-19 vaccines and financial aid to Cambodia during the pandemic.

References

Living people
High Commissioners of Australia to Vanuatu
Ambassadors of Australia to the United Arab Emirates
University of Sydney alumni
Monash University alumni
1973 births
Australian people of Korean descent
Ambassadors of Australia to Cambodia